Ralph Waldo Wright (May 17, 1908 – December 31, 1983) was a Disney animator and story/storyboard writer who provided the gloomy, sullen voice of Eeyore from the popular Winnie the Pooh franchise.

Biography

Wright came to the studio in the 1940s, and became well known throughout the ensuing decades for his endearingly gloomy and sullen personality traits as well as his bass voice.  He turned out to be a natural model for Eeyore when the studio began development on Winnie the Pooh and the Honey Tree.  He, along with his fellow Disney contemporaries, was a pioneer in the use of "gags" within cartoons, often acted out in front of the "story board," a bulletin board pinned with sequential sketches of the cartoon's scenes.  Early on, with Goofy's Glider and other "How To" cartoons, Ralph pioneered the story concept featuring a hero's failed attempt at achieving his goals. This technique is still in use today in most major animation studios. Warner Bros. Cartoons incorporated this premise into Wile E. Coyote and the Road Runner, Sylvester and Tweety, and Bugs Bunny and Daffy Duck cartoons. This highly reusable format proved to be wildly successful. In fact, full credit was attributed by Frank Tashlin interviewed by Michael Barrier in 2004: "That all came from a marvelous fellow who came from Tillamook, Oregon, a fellow by the name of Ralph Wright. He came down, and his pants were twelve inches too short for him, and he wore suspenders—he was out of the hills. But he had a crazy, crazy mind, almost as wild as Roy Williams, who is the best of all. Ralph did the first story of that type for Jack Kinney, called How to Ride a Horse. The Goof tried to stay on the horse—boom, off, another joke. That was the beginning of what still seems to be going on today. Then he and Kinney made more—a series of jokes, just one problem and working it out. It's like a symphony, with a theme and then the development of that theme."

He spent the last 30 years of his life in San Luis Obispo County in Los Osos, California.

He died on the final day of 1983, at his home in Los Osos from a heart attack, at the age of 75.

Credits
Everything that Ralph Wright worked on are by Walt Disney Productions except as noted.

Writer/Storyboard Team
Goofy's Glider (1940) (story)
The Art of Skiing (1941) (story)
The Art of Self Defense (1941) (story)
Donald's Garden (1942) (story)
Bambi (1942) (story developer)
Saludos Amigos (1942) (story)
How to Swim (1942) (story)
Victory Vehicles (1943) (writer)
The Three Caballeros (1944) (story)
The Eyes Have It (1945) (story)
Donald's Crime (1945) (story)
No Sail (1945) (story)
Song of the South (1946) (cartoon story)
Crazy with the Heat (1947) (story)
The House Cat (Felis Vulgaris) (1948) (story supervisor) (Gaumont British Animation)
The Cuckoo (1948) (story supervisor) (Gaumont British Animation)
The Australian Platypus (1949) (story supervisor) (Gaumont British Animation)
Dude Duck (1951) (story)
Plutopia (1951) (story)
R'coon Dawg (1951) (story)
Lambert the Sheepish Lion (1952) (story)
Trick or Treat (1952) (story)
Peter Pan (1953) (story)
Don's Fountain of Youth (1953) (story)
The Wonderful World of Disney (1956–1964, six episodes) (story, writer)
Siam (1954)
Lady and the Tramp (1955) (story)
Perri (1957) (writer)
Sleeping Beauty (1959) (additional story)
Popeye the Sailor (1960, five episodes) (story) (Jack Kinney Productions, King Features Syndicate)
Mr. Magoo (1960, five episodes) (story) (UPA)
The Dick Tracy Show (1961, nine episodes) (story) (UPA)
Nikki, Wild Dog of the North (1961) (writer)
Aquamania (1961) (story)
Gay Purr-ee (1962) (additional dialog) (UPA, Warner Bros.)
Snuffy Smith and Barney Google (1963, one episode) (writer) (Format Films, King Features Syndicate)
Salmon Loafer (1963) (story) (Walter Lantz Productions)
Yellowstone Cubs (1963) (writer)
Winnie the Pooh and the Honey Tree (1966) (story)
The Jungle Book (1967) (story)
Winnie the Pooh and the Blustery Day (1968) (story)
The Aristocats (1970) (story)
Bedknobs and Broomsticks (1971) (animation story)
Rogue's Rock (1974-1976 TV series) (ITV)
The Many Adventures of Winnie the Pooh (1977) (story)

Actor
Winnie the Pooh and the Honey Tree (1966) .... Eeyore (voice)
Winnie the Pooh and the Blustery Day (1968) .... Eeyore (voice)
The Many Adventures of Winnie the Pooh (1977) .... Eeyore (voice)
Winnie the Pooh and a Day for Eeyore (1983) .... Eeyore (voice) (final film role)

Director
Siam (1954)
Perri (1957)

Miscellaneous crew
The Art of Self Defense (1941) (animator)
Perri (1957) (composer: songs)
The Many Adventures of Winnie the Pooh (1977) (performer: "Mind Over Matter", "Hip Hip Pooh-ray!")

References

External links
 

1908 births
1983 deaths
American animators
American male screenwriters
American male voice actors
American animated film directors
Animation screenwriters
Walt Disney Animation Studios people
Male actors from Grants Pass, Oregon
20th-century American male actors
People from Los Osos, California
Screenwriters from California
20th-century American male writers
20th-century American screenwriters